Auburn Mall may refer to:
Auburn Mall (Alabama) in Auburn, Alabama
Auburn Mall (Maine) in Auburn, Maine
Auburn Mall (Massachusetts) in Auburn, Massachusetts